The Yongji North railway station  is a railway station of Datong–Xi'an Passenger Railway located in Yongji, Shanxi, China. It started operation on 1 July 2014, together with the Railway.

Railway stations in China opened in 2014
Railway stations in Shanxi